The Swedish Runestone, designated U 1173 in the Rundata catalogue, is an 11th-century Swedish Viking Age runestone which was located in Princes Street Gardens, Edinburgh, below Edinburgh Castle Esplanade, within a fenced enclosure adjacent to Ramsay Garden. Due to security concerns it was removed from its location in December 2017 and was moved in 2020 to 50 George Square, Edinburgh just outside University of Edinburgh's Department of Scandinavian Studies.

Originally from Lilla Ramsjö in present-day Morgongåva, Heby Municipality, it was donated to the Society of Antiquaries of Scotland in 1787 by Sir Alexander Seton of Preston and Ekolsund (né Baron 1738–1814), and was presented to the Princes Street Proprietors by the Society in 1821. It is one of three Swedish runestones in Britain; the other two (U 104 & U 1160) are in the Ashmolean Museum, Oxford in England.

Carving 
The carving on the stone features a centrally located cross, encircled by a serpent. The runic inscription is carved within the serpent, whose head and tail are linked with the cross' shaft. There are 18 runestones in Sweden which bear similar features and are believed to have been carved by a runemaster called Erik.

There are two additional crosses carved into the runestone – one on the right-hand edge of the stone, and one at the front of the stone, above the inscription, on the right-hand side. They do not exhibit the same level of craftsmanship and are believed to have been added later, perhaps in the 19th century.

Replica Runestone in Morgongåva 
In 2014 a replica of stone U 1173 was made in Sweden and placed where the original would have come from, at Morgongåva in Uppsala, by a group called Hebys "nya" runsten, led by project manager Mats Köben, an amateur archaeologist and enthusiast. This replica was carved by runemaster Kalle Dahlberg (Runistare) who visited Edinburgh in 2013 to measure the stone and record the design, before carving it from pink granite, sourced from Vätö Stenhuggeri at Adelsö Island.

References

Further reading
Anon (J. Dillon & J. Jamieson) (1822) 'Account of a stone with a runic inscription, presented to the Society by the late Sir Alexander Seton of Preston, and of some other inscriptions of the same kind in the Isle of Man', Archaeologia Scotica, 2.2, pp. 490–501
Graham-Campbell, James (2004) ''Danes...in this Country': discovering Vikings in Scotland', Proc Soc Antiq Scot, 134, pp. 201–239
McNaughton, Adam (1980) 'Edinburgh's Runestone', Northern Studies, 15, pp. 29–33
Sveriges Runinskrifter, (1953–1958), ix, pp. 653–656

External links
Canmore Entry
Information from the Samnordisk runtextdatabas, at Runinskrifter.net (in Swedish)
Complete information about the U 1173, rune carver Erik's other rune stones and the story of the work to create a copy
A short video documenting the removal of "Edinburgh's Travelling Runestone".

Scottish culture
Scandinavian archaeology
Runestones
1173
Sweden–United Kingdom relations